Andrew Fink (born July 30, 1985) is a Republican member of the Michigan House of Representatives, first elected in 2020.

Early life, education, and legal career
Fink was born on July 30, 1985, in Superior Township, Washtenaw County, Michigan. He received a bachelor's degree in politics from  Hillsdale College and a J.D. from the University of Michigan Law School. He was a member of the United States Marine Corps Judge Advocate Division from 2011 to 2014.

In 2017, he moved from Ypsilanti to Hillsdale, where he ran a satellite office of his family's law firm, Fink and Fink, PLLC. He was district director for Mike Shirkey, a Republican member of the Michigan State Senate and the Senate Majority Leader, from January 2019 to January 2020. Fink is a member of the Federalist Society and was a commissioner-at-large for the State Bar of Michigan.

Political career
In the 2020 Republican primary for the Michigan House of Representatives, District 58, Fink ran against farmer Andy Welden, realtor Daren Wiseley, and Hillsdale City Mayor Adam Stockford. The district covers Hillsdale County and Branch; incumbent Eric Leutheuser could not run for reelection due to term limits. Of the 16,881 total votes in the August 2020 Republican primary, Fink received 6,520 votes (38.62%), Welden 4,310 votes (25.53%); Wiseley 3,126 votes 18.52%), and Stockford 2,925 votes (17.33%).

During his 2020 campaign, Fink took the position that Governor Gretchen Whitmer's actions in response to the COVID-19 pandemic in Michigan were unconstitutional.  His primary campaign was supported by Citizens for Energizing Michigan's Economy (CEME), a 501(c)(4) "dark money" group related to Consumers Energy, which ran several mailers and ads in favor of Fink.

In the general election, Fink faced Democratic nominee Tamara Barnes of Coldwater, a director of the Kalamazoo Valley Museum.  Fink won 71.22% of the vote (30,208 votes) and Barnes 28.78% of the vote (12,208 votes).

Upon taking office, Fink was assigned to the House Appropriations, Military and Veterans Affairs and State Police; and Health Policy committees.

After redistricting, in 2022, Fink was elected to the 35th district.

Personal life
Fink lives in Adams Township. He is married and has five children.

References 

Republican Party members of the Michigan House of Representatives
People from Ypsilanti, Michigan
1985 births
Living people